Aralbay (Bashkir and ) is a rural locality (a village) in Zarechensky Selsoviet, Kugarchinsky District, Bashkortostan, Russia. The population was 109 as of 2010. There are 2 streets.

Geography 
Aralbay is located 24 km northwest of Mrakovo (the district's administrative centre) by road. Voskresenskoye is the nearest rural locality.

References 

Rural localities in Kugarchinsky District